The 1952–53 Northern Football League season was the 55th in the history of the Northern Football League, a football competition in Northern England.

Clubs

The league featured 13 clubs which competed in the last season, along with one new club:
 Durham City

League table

No changes following this season.

References

1952-53
4